Punks Arrives from America (German: Punks kommt aus Amerika) is a 1935 German comedy film directed by Karl Heinz Martin and starring Attila Hörbiger, Lien Deyers, Ralph Arthur Roberts and Sybille Schmitz. Produced and distributed by UFA, it was made at the company's Babelsberg Studios in Potsdam. The film's sets were designed by the art director Otto Guelstorff. Location shooting took place around Hamburg. Along with Fresh Wind from Canada it was one of several seemingly innocuous comedies released that supported the Nazi Party's Heim ins Reich policy.

Synopsis
A German citizen who has been away in the United States, and has becomes Americanised and acquired the nickname of "punks" returns home after some bad fortune. He manages to eventually overcome his family and former friends' bad opinion of him by rescuing his uncle's business from a robbery.

Cast
 Attila Hörbiger as Werner 'Punks' Holzhausen
 Lien Deyers as 	Marlis
 Ralph Arthur Roberts as Holenius, Antiquitätenhändler
 Sybille Schmitz as 	Britta Geistenberg
 Henry Lorenzen as von Schlieff
 Oskar Sima as 	Sigorski
 Erika Glässner as 	Yvonne de Carmagnac
 Georges Boulanger as 	Ein Geiger
 Maria Meissner as 	Frau Oppmann
 Josef Sieber as 	Chauffeur
 Ekkehard Arendt as Ober im Golfclub
 Ernst Behmer as 	Bademeister
 Hermann Braun as Caddy im Golfclub
 Louis Brody as 	Barkeeper
 Adolf Fischer as 	LKW-Fahrer
 Illo Gutschwager as 	Junge an der Tankstelle
 Bruno Hübner as Bridgespieler
 Karl Jüstel as Hotelgast
 Alfred Karen as 	Hotelgast
 Paquita Lorenz as Verkäuferin
 Edith Oß as Dienstmädchen
 Bert Schmidt-Moris as Liftboy
 Aida St. Paul as 	Bridgespielerin
 Egon Stief as LKW-Fahrer
 Elisabeth von Ruets as 	Bridegespielerin
 Erich Walter as 	Markoff
 Hugo Werner-Kahle as Van der Meuleen

References

Bibliography
 Klaus, Ulrich J. Deutsche Tonfilme: Jahrgang 1934. Klaus-Archiv, 1988.
 Rentschler, Eric. The Ministry of Illusion: Nazi Cinema and Its Afterlife. Harvard University Press, 1996.
 Waldman, Harry. Nazi Films in America, 1933–1942. McFarland, 2008.

External links 
 

1935 films
Films of Nazi Germany
German comedy films
1935 comedy films
1930s German-language films
German black-and-white films
1930s German films
Films directed by Karlheinz Martin
Films shot in Hamburg
Films shot at Babelsberg Studios
UFA GmbH films
Films based on German novels